The 1990 Tooheys 1000 was a motor race held on 30 September 1990 at the Mount Panorama Circuit just outside Bathurst, New South Wales, Australia. The event was open to cars eligible under CAMS Group 3A regulations, commonly known as Group A Touring Cars, with three engine capacity classes. It was the 31st running of the "Bathurst 1000".

The race, which was Round 2 of both the 1990 Australian Endurance Championship and the 1990 Australian Manufacturers' Championship, resulted in an upset victory for British driver Win Percy and 1986 Bathurst 1000 winner Allan Grice in a Holden Racing Team entered Holden Commodore over the Dick Johnson Racing Ford Sierra of Jeff Allam and Paul Radisich and the Perkins Engineering Holden Commodore of Larry Perkins and Tomas Mezera.

The race marked the first Bathurst 1000 victory for the Holden Racing Team and the team's first race win since Larry Perkins won the Group A support race at the Australian Grand Prix in November 1988.

Class structure

Cars competed in three divisions as follows:

Division 1: 3001cc and Over
Division 1 featured the turbocharged Ford Sierras, Nissan Skylines and Toyota Supras, the V8 Holden Commodores and a BMW 635CSi.

Division 2: 1601 to 3000cc
Division 2 was composed of BMW M3s, a BMW 323i and a Mercedes-Benz 190E.

Division 3: Up to 1600cc
Division 3 was composed exclusively of various models of Toyota Corolla.

Tooheys Top Ten

During the final qualifying session, Richards reportedly matched Longhurst's top speed on Conrod.* 1990 was the fifth and last time that Allan Grice was the fastest of the Holden Commodore runners in the Top Ten. Previously he had led the Holden charge in 1982 (pole), 1985 (4th), 1986 (2nd) and 1987 (7th).* V8 Holdens were back in the runoff after missing out in 1989, with the Larry Perkins / Tomas Mezera car, and the Percy/Grice HRT car qualifying over 4 seconds faster than the Commodores had managed 12 months earlier.

Official results

Statistics
 Provisional Pole Position - #25 Tony Longhurst - 2:13.84
 Pole Position - #10 Klaus Niedzwiedz - 2:13.94
 Fastest Lap - #1 Mark Skaife - 2:15.46 (165.12 km/h) - Lap 98 (new lap record)
 Race time of winning car - 6:40:52.64
 Race average of winning car - 149.72 km/h

See also
1990 Australian Touring Car season

References

External links
 Tooheys 1000 Bathurst 1990, touringcarracing.net
 "Tooheys 1000 - Mount Panorama, Bathurst - 30th September", 1990, www.uniquecarsandparts.com.au
 Images from Bathurst 1990, www.autopics.com.au

Motorsport in Bathurst, New South Wales
Tooheys 1000
September 1990 sports events in Australia